Vasilis Papageorgopoulos (born 27 June 1947) is a retired Greek sprinter, former mayor of Thessaloniki and convicted felon. He won two medals at the European Indoor Championships as well as the bronze medal in the 100 metres at the 1971 European Championships in Athletics. He was named the 1971 Greek Athlete of the Year.

Biography
Papageorgopoulos' personal best in 100 metres was 10.22 seconds, achieved in August 1972 in Izmir. This ranks him twelfth among Greek 100 metre sprinters. He also studied medicine.

Papageorgopoulos first got involved in politics in 1978 when he was elected City councilor of Thessaloniki. He practiced dentistry until 1981, when he was elected as a member of the Greek Parliament, representing Thessaloniki, for the Conservative New Democracy party . From 1 January 1999 to 31 December 2010, Papageorgopoulos was the mayor of Thessaloniki.

Corruption charges
In April 2011, he was among 25 people contacted by an investigating magistrate with a probe into alleged embezzlement of 51.4 million euros of the municipality. He was also accused by his successor Yiannis Boutaris of providing inaccurate financial figures. In February 2013, he was found guilty and sentenced to life imprisonment for embezzling 17.9 million euro of the Municipality of Thessaloniki while he was mayor. In July 2014, the sentence was reduced to a maximum of 20 years after an appeals court in Thessaloniki ruled that Papageorgopoulos's crimes amounted to acting as "accessory to the stealing of municipal funds while in office.”
In July 2015 Papageorgopoulos was granted parole due to health problems.

Honours

 At the 1972 Summer Olympics he was forced to scratch from the semi-finals after he had pulled a groin muscle in the quarter-finals.

References

External links
 Website of Vasilis Papageorgopoulos
 Profile at the Thessaloniki Association "The White Tower"
 

1947 births
Living people
Mayors of Thessaloniki
Greek dentists
Greek male sprinters
Athletes (track and field) at the 1972 Summer Olympics
Athletes (track and field) at the 1976 Summer Olympics
Olympic athletes of Greece
Athletes from Thessaloniki
Greek sportsperson-politicians
Sport in Thessaloniki
New Democracy (Greece) politicians
European Athletics Championships medalists
Corruption in Greece
Greek prisoners sentenced to life imprisonment
Greek politicians convicted of crimes
Politicians convicted of embezzlement
Mediterranean Games gold medalists for Greece
Mediterranean Games silver medalists for Greece
Mediterranean Games medalists in athletics
Athletes (track and field) at the 1971 Mediterranean Games
Athletes (track and field) at the 1975 Mediterranean Games
Politicians convicted of corruption